Food Safety Authority may refer to:
European Food Safety Authority
New Zealand Food Safety Authority
Norwegian Food Safety Authority
Food Safety Authority of Ireland

See also
Food safety
Food Standards Agency